Michel Crépu (born 24 August 1954, in Étampes) is a French writer and literary critic as well as the editor-in-chief of Nouvelle Revue française since 2015.

Biography 
As a journalist, Michel Crépu is a literary critic. He was responsible for the literary pages of the Catholic newspaper La Croix before becoming editor in 2002 and then in 2010 the director of the Revue des deux Mondes.

Michel Crépu is also a writer, an essayist and novelist.

In January 2015, he was appointed chief editor of Nouvelle Revue française by Antoine Gallimard and to the reading committee of the éditions Gallimard.

Work 
1988: La Force de l'admiration, 
1990: Charles Du Bos ou la Tentation de l'irréprochable, éditions du Félin
1995: Dieu est avec celui qui ne s'en fait pas (chronique autobiographique), NiL Éditions, 1995.
1997: Le Tombeau de Bossuet (essay), éditions Grasset – (Prix Femina Vacaresco) Prix Femina essai and Grand Prix de la critique
1998: Bourdieu et les Forces du mal
1999: La Confusion des lettres (essay), éditions Grasset
2001: Sainte-Beuve : portrait d'un sceptique, 
2004: Quartier général (noel), éditions Grasset
2006: Solitude de la grenouille, éditions Flammarion
2006: Le Silence des livres suivi de Ce vice encore impuni, with George Steiner, Arléa, 2006.
2009: Lecture : journal littéraire 2002-2009, éditions Gallimard, series L'Infini
2011: Le Souvenir du monde: essai sur Chateaubriand, éditions Grasset – prix des Deux Magots 2012.
2012:  En découdre avec le pré (essay on Philippe Jaccottet), éditions des Crépuscules
2014: Écrire, écrire, pourquoi ? Linda Lê: Interview with Michel Crépu
2014: Écrire, écrire, pourquoi ? Yannick Haenel: Interview with Michel Crépu
2015: Un jour, éditions Gallimard, series "Blanche"

Articles 
"Cioran, le barbare subtil," in L'Atelier du roman, n° 64, Flammarion, 2010, pp. 105-107
"L'apparition de Michel Houellebecq," in Le Débat, n° 210, Gallimard, 2020, pp. 217-22

References

External links 
 Michel Crépu : copinages, connivences et renvois d’ascenseur on ACRIMED
 Micjhel Crépu on France Culture
 Michel Crépu on Babelio + podcast
 Conférence de Michel Crépu sur la littérature russe video on LCDR
 Les nouveaux habits de "La Nouvelle Revue française" on Gallimard
 Blog de michel Crépu on Nouvelle Revue Française

20th-century French non-fiction writers
21st-century French non-fiction writers
20th-century French essayists
21st-century French essayists
French literary critics
Prix des Deux Magots winners
Chevaliers of the Ordre des Arts et des Lettres
1954 births
People from Étampes
Living people
Nouvelle Revue Française editors